Lady X may refer to:
 Another stage name of American professional wrestler Peggy Lee Leather
 Recurring character in 1960 Franco-Belgian comic book series Buck Danny
 Character in 2004 fighting game Rumble Roses
 Antagonist of 2012 American animated film Foodfight!

See also
 The Divorce of Lady X, 1938 British comedy film
 
 Miss X (disambiguation)
 Madame X (disambiguation)